The 2022 Athletissima was the 47th edition of the annual outdoor track and field meeting in Lausanne, Switzerland. Held on 26 August at the Stade olympique de la Pontaise, it was the 11th leg of the 2022 Diamond League.

Results

References

External links
 

Athletissima
Athletissima
Athletissima
Athletissima